Steventon is a village and civil parish in Oxfordshire, England, about  south of Abingdon and a similar distance west of Didcot. It was part of Berkshire until the 1974 boundary changes transferred it to Oxfordshire. The 2011 Census recorded the parish population as 1,485.

Toponym
Steventon's toponym evolved from Stivetune in the 11th century via Estiventona in the 12th century, Stiveton, Stivington, Estiventon, Stiventon, Stuvinton and Steveington in the 13th century and Stephyngton in the 16th century before reaching its present form.

Priory
Steventon Priory was founded early in the 12th century in the reign of Henry I. It was an alien priory, controlled by the Benedictine Bec Abbey in Normandy. In the 14th century alien priories became unpopular with the Crown, and in the reign of Edward III the abbey was allowed to sell Steventon Priory to an English squire, Sir Hugh Calveley.

Church and chapel

Church of England
The Domesday Book of 1086 records a church in the manor of Steventon. The earliest part of the present Church of England parish church of St Michael and All Angels is a capital in the south arcade. It is in "stiff-leaf" style, which is an Early English feature. Page and Ditchfield concluded that it dated from about 1220.  In the 14th century St Michael's was rebuilt in Perpendicular Gothic style and apparently enlarged for Sir Hugh Calveley. The position of the tower is slightly unusual, on the south side of the nave and combined with the porch. The south aisle is of three and a half bays, parallelling the chancel and the eastern part of the nave, and having at its west end an arch into the bottom stage of the tower.

St Michael's is a Grade I listed building. Its parish is now linked with those of Drayton and Milton.  The tower has a ring of six bells. William Yare of Reading, Berkshire cast the fourth and tenor bells in 1613. Henry I Knight, also of Reading, cast the second bell in 1617. Ellis II Knight and Henry III Knight cast the treble bell in 1674. William Taylor of Loughborough cast the third and fifth bells in 1849, presumably at the foundry in Oxford that his family ran until 1854.

Methodist
A Wesleyan chapel was built in Steventon in 1861. It is a Gothic revival brick building on Oxford Road, near the bridge over the railway and the site of the former railway station. It became Steventon Methodist Church and was used for worship until the early 21st century. By 2009 the church had closed for worship and was advertised for sale.

Economic and social history
The south side of the Causeway is lined by houses, a number of which are medieval timber-framed buildings. Steventon is on what used to be the main road between Oxford, Abingdon and Newbury. The section from Oxford and Abingdon through Steventon to Chilton Pond was turnpiked in 1755. From the 1920s it was classified the A34 road. In the 1970s the A34 was re-routed as a dual carriageway bypassing Abingdon, Drayton and Steventon, and the section between Steventon Hill and Abingdon was detrunked and reclassified as the B4017. 

Building had begun in 1796 at Semington Junction in Wiltshire and reached West Challow in 1807. The final section, from West Challow through Steventon to Abingdon, was completed in 1810. There was a Steventon Lock in the parish. Traffic on the canal had virtually ceased by 1901 and the route was formally abandoned in 1914. The Wilts & Berks Canal Trust is currently restoring the canal. In June 1840 the Great Western Railway opened Steventon railway station. British Railways closed Steventon station in 1964.

Steventon was the last place in North Berkshire to continue open field farming. Parliament passed an inclosure act for Steventon's common land in 1807–08, but it was not implemented. In 1880 Parliament passed a second act to enclose the parish. The enclosure award was made in 1883 and implemented in 1885.

During a party in the early hours of New Year's Day 2003 Robert Tyrrell, the then landlord of the North Star pub in Steventon, bulldozed part of his own pub after his barman refused to serve him. Tyrrell was sentenced to 200 hours of community service and fined more than £3,000. The pub was repaired and re-opened by December 2003. The 17th-century timber-framed building is Grade II listed, and its restoration cost Tyrrell more than £100,000. In 2007 the work won a Vale of White Horse Design Scheme Award for Andrew Townsend, a local architect from Faringdon who designed the pub's restoration.

Amenities
Steventon has three public houses: the Cherry Tree controlled by Wadworth Brewery, The Fox and the North Star (see above). The North Star retains many 19th-century features, including a serving-hatch instead of a bar, and ale being poured directly from casks instead of drawn by hand pumps from a cellar.  Steventon has a bakery, a Co-Operative store and a village hall.  Steventon has a Sports and Social Club and the village green has a cricket pitch. The Fox, the North Star and the Sports and Social Club all have Aunt Sally teams that play in the Abingdon and District Aunt Sally League.  The Truck Festival is an annual music festival held near Steventon each July.

Gallery

References

Sources and further reading

External links

Steventon Oxfordshire Village Web

Civil parishes in Oxfordshire
Villages in Oxfordshire